East Swanzey is an unincorporated community in the town of Swanzey in Cheshire County, New Hampshire.

The village is located in the eastern portion of Swanzey, along the South Branch Ashuelot River, between New Hampshire Route 32 to the west and New Hampshire Route 12 to the northeast.

East Swanzey has a separate ZIP code (03446) from other areas, such as West Swanzey, in the town of Swanzey.

References

Unincorporated communities in New Hampshire
Unincorporated communities in Cheshire County, New Hampshire
Swanzey, New Hampshire